Vardaman can refer to:

 James K. Vardaman (1861–1930), American politician from the U.S. state of Mississippi
 James K. Vardaman Jr. (1894–1972), American lawyer from Mississippi who served as the Governor of the Federal Reserve System from 1946 to 1958
 Vardaman, Mississippi, a town in the Southern United States
 Vardaman Bundren, a character in As I Lay Dying (1930), a novel by William Faulkner
 Ipomoea batatas cv. Vardaman, a variety of sweet potato cultivated in the United States